Luke Alexander Wilkinson (born 29 September 1990) is an English professional footballer who plays as a defender for National League club Woking.

Youth career
Wilkinson was born in Wells, Somerset. He started his career in the youth system of Bristol City and was offered a two-year scholarship in June 2007. He was part of the side that competed in the Premier Academy League.

Club career

Portsmouth
Wilkinson was released early from his contract with Bristol City at the age of 17 and was offered a trial by Premier League club Portsmouth. He played in a reserve game against Fulham, in which first-team manager Paul Hart described as the most impressive debut he had seen from any young player. The reserves remained unbeaten with Wilkinson in defence until the end of the season. His outstanding form for the reserves earned him a professional contract in July 2009.

In January 2010, he joined League Two club Northampton Town on a one-month loan, however, he failed to make an appearance for the club.

In February 2010, he joined Conference South club Eastleigh on an initial one-month loan, which was later extended until the end of the season.

Dagenham & Redbridge
In the summer of 2010, Wilkinson was released by Portsmouth and signed for newly promoted League One club Dagenham & Redbridge on a three-year contract. In November 2010, he joined Conference South club Boreham Wood on an initial one-month loan, making his debut in a 3–2 defeat at home to Dover Athletic. The loan was then extended by a further month, before it was extended once more until the end of the season. Wilkinson scored his first goal on the final day of 2010–11 in a 3–0 win at home to Lewes and finished the season with 28 appearances. He rejoined Boreham Wood in August 2011 on a five-month loan. He was a mainstay in the team, making 25 appearances, the last of which came in a 2–1 defeat at home to Woking on 28 January 2012, before returning to Dagenham at the end of January. In February 2012, he joined fellow Conference South club Dartford on loan. In March 2012, his loan was extended until the end of the season after scoring two headers in consecutive wins over Havant & Waterlooville and Sutton United. He claimed his first piece of silverware as Dartford were promoted to the Conference Premier via their play-off win over Welling United on 13 May 2012.

Wilkinson made his professional debut for Dagenham on 1 September 2012 in a 2–2 draw Kingsmeadow to AFC Wimbledon. He cemented his place in the first-team by scoring four goals, which prompted Daggers manager John Still to offer him a new contract until 2015. He finished 2012–13 with 46 appearances in all competitions and won the club's Player of the Year award. This led to reported interest from Premier League clubs Aston Villa and Norwich City. However, no move materialised and Wilkinson admitted that he needed another few years to develop as a player before making the step up.

Wilkinson's start to the 2013–14 season was delayed by a groin injury picked up in pre-season, before making his return at the end of August in a 3–0 defeat to Mansfield Town. He went on to make 25 appearances but a combination of further injuries, the form of Scott Doe and Brian Saah, and the late emergence of Ian Gayle resigned Wilkinson to the bench for the majority of the season. In May 2014, he was placed on the transfer list at his own request and his name was circulated to other clubs highlighting his availability. In June 2014, he stated he was happy to fight for his place if a move away from the club didn't materialise.

Luton Town
On 7 July 2014, Wilkinson signed for League Two club Luton Town on a one-year contract, managed by his former Dagenham manager John Still, for an undisclosed fee. He debuted on the opening day of 2014–15 in a 1–0 win away to Carlisle United, Luton's first Football League match in five years. Wilkinson scored his first goal in a 2–0 win at home to Oxford United on 27 September 2014, and this was followed up with a goal in the following match, a 2–1 win away to Stevenage. He was named League Two Player of the Month for September 2014, during which Luton kept a clean sheet in each of the four matches Wilkinson played in that month. Wilkinson was sent off on two occasions, the first coming in stoppage time during a 1–0 defeat away to Burton Albion on 22 November, a result that ended Luton's 11-match unbeaten run in League Two, and the second coming in a 1–0 win at home to Carlisle United on 14 February 2015. The latter red card coincided with a four match suspension for defensive partner Steve McNulty, who was sent off for a studs-up challenge in the previous match, a 2–2 draw at home to York City. In their absence, Luton lost twice in a row, during which stand-in defenders Alex Lacey and Fraser Franks failed to impress. Wilkinson finished the season with four goals from 48 appearances, triggering a one-year contract extension to keep him at Luton until the summer of 2016.

Wilkinson made his first appearance of 2015–16 in the starting lineup away to Accrington Stanley on the opening day of the season, which finished as a 1–1 draw, and followed up with a goal in the following league match, a 2–2 draw at home to Oxford United on 15 August 2015. He went on to score two goals in September, the first coming in a 3–1 win away to Cambridge United on 5 September, and the second coming in a 3–1 win away to Morecambe on 29 September. Wilkinson made his final appearance for Luton in a 4–3 defeat at home to Northampton Town on 12 December.

Stevenage
On 22 January 2016, Wilkinson was sold to fellow League Two club Stevenage on a contract until the end of 2015–16, with Luton replacing him with Alan Sheehan, who was signed on loan from Bradford City later that day. Wilkinson said he was surprised by the decision but was looking forward to helping Stevenage climb the table. He debuted a day later in a 0–0 draw at home to Barnet. Wilkinson scored his first two goals for Stevenage in a 3–2 defeat at home to League Two leaders Northampton Town on 19 March. He finished the season with 19 appearances for Stevenage and signed a new undisclosed length contract with the club after the end of the season.

Wilkinson was released by Stevenage at the end of the 2018–19 season.

Yeovil Town
Following his release from Stevenage, Wilkinson signed for National League club Yeovil Town on a two-year contract.

Woking
On 20 May 2022, Wilkinson agreed to join fellow National League club Woking upon the expiry of his contract with Yeovil, signing a two-year contract and linking up with his former manager Darren Sarll.

Career statistics

Honours
Dartford
Conference South play-offs: 2011–12

Individual
Dagenham & Redbridge Player of the Year: 2012–13
Football League Two Player of the Month: September 2014

References

1990 births
Living people
English footballers
People from Wells, Somerset
Association football defenders
Portsmouth F.C. players
Eastleigh F.C. players
Northampton Town F.C. players
Dagenham & Redbridge F.C. players
Boreham Wood F.C. players
Dartford F.C. players
Luton Town F.C. players
Stevenage F.C. players
Yeovil Town F.C. players
Woking F.C. players
English Football League players
National League (English football) players